Yosef Kremerman (10 January 1926 – 12 November 1981) was an Israeli politician who served as a member of the Knesset for Herut, Gahal and Likud between 1964 and 1977.

Biography
Born in Haifa during the Mandate era, Kremerman was educated at a high school in Tel Aviv, before studying law, business administration and forestry.

A member of the Irgun, he travelled to Europe after World War II to work as an emissary with Holocaust survivors, before returning to Israel on the Altalena. He joined the Herut party, and became chairman of its Tel Aviv branch and editor of its HaYom newspaper. He was also appointed the party's treasurer in 1957. He was on the party's list for the 1961 elections, and although he failed to win a seat, he entered the Knesset on 20 August 1964 as a replacement for the deceased Avraham Drori. He retained his seat in elections the following year (before which Herut had formed the Gahal alliance with the Liberal Party), and in elections in 1969 and 1973 (by which time Gahal had merged into Likud). He lost his seat in the 1977 elections.

Outside politics Krememan was one of the owners of the Etz Lavud company. He died in 1981.

References

External links

1926 births
1981 deaths
Jews in Mandatory Palestine
People from Haifa
Irgun members
20th-century Israeli businesspeople
Herut politicians
Gahal politicians
Likud politicians
Members of the 5th Knesset (1961–1965)
Members of the 6th Knesset (1965–1969)
Members of the 7th Knesset (1969–1974)
Members of the 8th Knesset (1974–1977)